is a Japanese politician and a former governor of Toyama Prefecture in Japan, first elected in 2004. A native of Toyama, Toyama and a graduate of the University of Tokyo, he worked in the Ministry of Home Affairs from 1969 before being elected governor.

References 
 

1945 births
Living people
People from Toyama (city)
University of Tokyo alumni
Governors of Toyama Prefecture

Politicians from Toyama Prefecture